Hekistocarpa is a genus of flowering plants belonging to the family Rubiaceae.

Its native range is Western Tropical Africa to Cameroon.

Species:
 Hekistocarpa minutiflora Hook.f.

References

Rubiaceae
Rubiaceae genera